Crassispira somalica is a species of sea snail, a marine gastropod mollusk in the family Pseudomelatomidae.

Description
The length of the shell attains 20 mm.

Distribution
This marine species occurs off Somalia and is the first typical Crassispira species found off East Africa.

References

 Morassi M. & Bonfitto A. (2013) Four new African turriform gastropods (Mollusca: Conoidea). Zootaxa 3710(3): 271–280. page(s): 277

External links

 
 

Endemic fauna of Somalia
somalica
Gastropods described in 2013